Fagaitua is a village in the east of Tutuila Island, American Samoa. It is located on the central coast of Fagaitua Bay. Fagaitua is located at a shallow bay on the south coast of the island, in-between Lauli'i and Alofau. It is home to Luafagā, Le'iato's house of chiefs, and the big malae Malotumau.

Coral reefs at Fagaitua suffered significant damage during the 2009 tsunami.

Fagaitua is home to the smallest and most rural high school in American Samoa. Fagaitua High School, whose student body is around 500 as of 2018, practices football at the old rugby field by Pago Pago Bay. It has never had its own field but has utilized the uneven turf at Onesosopo Park, which is replete with volcanic stubble, water, toads, and sand traps. Rob Shaffer was hired as a teacher by Fagaitua in February 1972 and eventually also took over coaching of the high school's football team. Shaffer has played varsity as a quarterback for Oceanside High School under head coach Herb Meyer.

In 2018, a monument was made for the Fagaitua High School Alumni Association in order to commemorate Fagaitua High School's 50th anniversary. The statue will eventually be mounted onto the pedestal which was designed and constructed by the American Samoa Department of Public Works. It is located in front of Fagaitua High School. The statue depicts a Viking warrior with his head tilted towards the east and the Eastern Star. The statue was made locally on Tutuila Island.

Demographics

Notable residents
 Susana Leiato Lutali – former First Lady of American Samoa (1985–1989, 1993–1997)

References

Villages in American Samoa
Tutuila